Rogério Dutra Silva was the defending champion but lost to Steve Darcis 6–7(2–7), 6–4, 5–7 in the final.

Seeds

Draw

Finals

Top half

Bottom half

External Links
Main Draw
Qualifying Draw

BNP Paribas Primrose Bordeaux - Singles
2017 Singles